"A Million Voices" is the name of the song that represented Russia in the Eurovision Song Contest 2015. It was performed by the Russian singer, songwriter, actress, and model Polina Gagarina. In the grand final it received 303 points, finishing second, becoming the first second-placed song ever to receive more than 300 points in the Eurovision Song Contest. The song is written by Swedish songwriters Gabriel Alares, Joakim Björnberg, by Australian Katrina Noorbergen and by Russians Leonid Gutkin and Vladimir Matetsky.

Critical reception
Charlotte Runcie of The Daily Telegraph described the song as "synth-heavy with oodles of key changes, on record it sounds quite a lot like a standard karaoke ballad - think Take That-lite".

Music video
The music video of the song was presented on March 15, 2015. On the same day it was published on the official channel of the contest on YouTube and gained more than 10 million views, making it the most watched Eurovision 2015 music video on the contest's channel.

The shooting of the video involved 25 people, including children, adults and elderly people of different races and nationalities,The Holi part is the end.

Political controversy
The 63-year-old singing contest in which viewers phone in to vote for their favourite has always largely been political, says Karen Fricker, a professor of Dramatic Arts at the Brock University of Canada who was in Vienna for the grand final. "The song is extremely effective and I would argue, manipulative," says Fricker, "because it's one of those songs that's all about how we should all get together and link hands and be human beings together and believe in peace", and added, "We have to bear in mind this song is representing Russia, a country that is very involved in aggressive foreign relations at the moment".

Before the final, Fricker pointed out that Gagarina did not earn boos from the crowd. While she acknowledged it may be a reflection of the crisis in Ukraine becoming less popular news, Fricker told CTV News, "it's also perhaps because fans just love the song".

Booing in the presentation
The live audience could be heard booing whenever a country awarded points to Russia at the song contest, which took place at the Wiener Stadthalle in Vienna, prompting one of the hosts to remind the audience that “music should stand over politics tonight”. Conchita Wurst, who was condemned by leading Russian religious figures following her win last year, called the boos “incomprehensible” and said that Gagarina “cannot be blamed for the rules” in her home country.

The booing was thought to be linked to Russia's anti-LGBT policies and its involvement in the Ukraine conflict. Conservative Russians viewed Conchita Wurst as a threat to traditional family values, and expressed concern about hosting the Eurovision Song Contest if Russia won. Despite the negative reaction from the Eurovision crowd, Russia's entry Polina Gagarina came in a respectable second place after Sweden's Måns Zelmerlöw took the crown with the song Heroes. Anti-booing technology was reportedly installed in Wiener Stadthalle to prevent boos from being heard on television.

Russia's communications coordinator for Eurovision told The Moscow Times: “It was very embarrassing for us last year when this happened, as it was not the spirit of the contest. "We are here to build bridges, as the motto [of the contest] says".

Track listing
Digital download – single
A Million Voices – 3:05

Charts

Weekly charts

References

External links

2015 singles
2015 songs
Eurovision songs of 2015
Eurovision songs of Russia
Number-one singles in Russia
Universal Music Group singles
Songs written by Gabriel Alares
English-language Russian songs